The Apco Keara is an Israeli single-place, paraglider that was designed and produced by Apco Aviation of Caesarea. It is now out of production.

Design and development
The Keara was designed as an intermediate glider. The four models are each named for their relative size. The glider was named for Kiara, the main protagonist of The Lion King II: Simba's Pride, the daughter of Simba and Nala.

The Keara introduced HIT Valves (High-Speed Intake Valves) with the intention to improve stability and performance at high speeds and at low angles of attack.

Variants
Keara XS
Extra small-sized model for light-weight pilots. The glider model is AFNOR Performance certified.
Keara S
Small-sized model for lighter pilots. The glider model is DHV 2 and AFNOR Performance certified.
Keara M
Mid-sized model for medium-weight pilots. The glider model is DHV 2 and AFNOR Performance certified.
Keara L
Large-sized model for heavier pilots. The glider model is DHV 2 certified.

Specifications (Keara L)

References

External links

Keara
Paragliders